Eric Rogers may refer to:

Eric Rogers (composer) (1921–1981), British composer, conductor and arranger
Eric M. Rogers (1902–1990), physics educator
Eric Rogers (gridiron football) (born 1991), gridiron football wide receiver

See also
Erik Rogers, American singer of metal band Stereomud